Firea is a Romanian surname. Notable people with the surname include:

Gabriela Firea (born 1972), Romanian journalist and politician
Vasile Firea (1908–1991), Romanian racewalker
Victor Firea (1923–2007), Romanian runner

Romanian-language surnames